United Nations Security Council Resolution 172, adopted unanimously on July 26, 1962, after examining the application of the Republic of Rwanda for membership in the United Nations, the Council recommended to the General Assembly that the Republic of Rwanda be admitted.

See also
List of United Nations Security Council Resolutions 101 to 200 (1953–1965)

References
Text of the Resolution at undocs.org

External links
 

 0172
History of Rwanda
 0172
 0172
1962 in Rwanda
July 1962 events